Helene Roberts Dillard  is an American plant pathologist, and academic. She is a fellow of the American Association for the Advancement of Science.

Education and career 
Dillard is originally from California, and graduated from University of California, Berkeley with her bachelor's degree in 1977, and then moved to the University of California, Davis where she earned her master's degree (1979) and Ph.D. (1984). From 1984 to 2014, she was a professor of plant pathology, at Cornell University, where she was promoted to professor in 1998. In 2013, she moved from Cornell to the University of California, Davis where she was named the dean of the College of Agricultural and Environmental Sciences.

Research 
Dillard's research centers on agriculture and diseases that impact plants.

Awards and honors 
Dillard is a fellow of American Phytopathological Society, and was elected a fellow of the American Association for the Advancement of Science in 2021.

References 

Living people
Fellows of the American Association for the Advancement of Science
University of California, Berkeley alumni
University of California, Davis alumni
University of California, Davis faculty
Year of birth missing (living people)